Indium acetylacetonate, also known as In(acac)3, is a compound with formula In(C5H7O2)3. It is a colorless solid.  It adopts an octahedral structure.

Uses

Indium acetylacetonate and tin(II) acetylacetonate can be used to prepare indium tin oxide thin films with an atmospheric‐pressure chemical vapor deposition method. The resulting thin films are transparent and conductive, with a thickness of about 200 nanometers. Copper indium gallium diselenide (CIGS) can also be produced with indium acetylacetonate. Thin-film CIGS solar cells are synthesized with atomic layer chemical vapour deposition (ALCVD) using In(acac)3 and hydrogen sulfide.

References

Indium compounds
Acetylacetonate complexes